Holy Lands is a 2017 French-Belgian comedy-drama film written and directed by Amanda Sthers and starring James Caan, Tom Hollander, Jonathan Rhys Meyers, Rosanna Arquette, Efrat Dor and Patrick Bruel.  It is based on Sthers' novel Les Terres saintes.

Plot
Facing a crossroads in life, American Jewish retired cardiologist Harry Rosenmerck leaves New York and his family with an unlikely plan to start a pig farm in Nazareth, causing the anger of local communities. His conflict with the town Rabbi, Moshe Cattan slowly turns into a friendship that leads him to reevaluate his relationship with his estranged family, including his difficult ex-wife, his 34-year-old student daughter, and his playwright son David. Through an emotional journey, this dysfunctional group will try to make their way back to each other, renewing ties when they all need it the most.

Cast
James Caan as Harry
Tom Hollander as Moshe
Jonathan Rhys Meyers as David
Rosanna Arquette as Monica
Efrat Dor as Annabelle
Patrick Bruel as Michel

Production
The film was shot in Israel and Belgium.

Reception
The film has a 30% rating on Rotten Tomatoes.  Christy Lemire of RogerEbert.com awarded the film one and a half stars.  Trevor Johnston of Radio Times awarded the film two stars out of five.

Accolades
The film won awards for Best Adapted Screenplay and Best Cinematography at the Downtown Film Festival in Los Angeles in 2018.

References

External links
 
 

English-language French films
English-language Belgian films
French comedy-drama films
Belgian comedy-drama films
Films based on French novels
StudioCanal films
Films shot in Israel
Films shot in Belgium
2010s English-language films
2010s French films